Zealand Worship is an American worship band, founded by Phil Joel (formerly of Newsboys), hailing from Franklin, Tennessee. The band started making music in 2015. They released, Zealand Worship - The EP, an extended play, with both Word Records and Warner Records, in 2015.

About Zealand Worship
Led by Phil Joel, best known for his long-standing role as bass player and vocalist for the multi-platinum selling band Newsboys, Zealand Worship has been faithfully traversing a road that has been as unscripted and unexpected as it has been ordained. When Joel left Newsboys after 13 years, it wasn't long before ministry opportunities began to emerge throughout the United States, New Zealand, Australia and China. Without even realizing it, Joel's perspective began to shift, opening his eyes to a new understanding about worship and his role in it. Joel and fellow musicians...have been operating “off the grid,” ministering where they have been invited, under the radar in a season of preparation for the next chapter, which is aptly titled Zealand Worship. Zealand Worship signed with Word Worship, a division of Word Entertainment, in May 2015. On Dec. 13th, 2017 the band announced their first full length project Liberated to be released on February 9, 2018.

Background
Zealand Worship was started by Phil Joel, formerly of the Newsboys, who is the leader of the group. They are from Franklin, Tennessee, where they started in 2012.

Music history
The band commenced as a musical entity in 2012, with their first release, Zealand Worship - The EP, an extended play, that was released on June 23, 2015, They are from Franklin, Tennessee, where they started in 2012. by Word Records in tandem with Warner Records.

Members
 Current members
Phil Joel (member of the Newsboys)
Ben Bugna
Ben Garrett

Discography

EPs
 Zealand Worship - The EP (June 23, 2015, Word/Warner)

Singles

Albums
 Liberated (2018)

References

External links
Official website

Musical groups from Tennessee
Musical groups established in 2012
Word Records artists
2012 establishments in Tennessee